Pandhayam is a 1967 Indian Tamil-language film produced and directed by A. Kasilingam, who also wrote the screenplay from a story by Madurai Thirumaran. The film stars Gemini Ganesan and Vijaya Nirmala. It was released on 29 September 1967. The film was remade in Hindi as Sachaai (1969)  and in Telugu as Manchi Mitrulu.

Plot

Cast 
 Gemini Ganesan
 Vijaya Nirmala
 A. V. M. Rajan
 Nagesh
 Sailasri
 Seethalakshmi
 Jothi

Production 
Pandhayam was produced and directed by A. Kasilingam under the banner Emkay Movies. Kasilingam also wrote the screenplay, based on a story by Madurai Thirumaran. Cinematography was handled by G. Durai, art direction by D. S. Godwankar, and the editing was jointly handled by K. Perumal and A. Sastha.

Soundtrack 
The soundtrack was composed by T. R. Pappa, and the lyrics were written by Kannadasan.

Release and reception 
Pandhayam was released on 29 September 1967, and distributed by Subbu. Kalki praised the film for its story and cast performances.

References

Bibliography

External links 
 

1960s Tamil-language films
Films scored by T. R. Pappa
Tamil films remade in other languages